Abbas (born 21 May 1975 as Mirza Abbas Ali) is a former Indian actor and model from Kolkata, who has predominantly appeared in Tamil and Telugu films, and a few films in Malayalam, Hindi and Kannada. He made his debut with Kathir's Kadhal Desam in 1996.

Career
Abbas grew up watching Hindi films. His maternal grandfather being an actor Farrukh Mirza acted in Neel Darpan (Bengali) and his paternal family being related to actor Feroz Khan. He partook in modelling assignments since his college days won "Face of 94"  in Bangalore. Initially, after hearing that director Kadhir was looking for a new actor for his latest venture, Abbas had recommended his friends who knew Tamil to audition and took part in a speculative audition at the insistence of his friend. Kadhir was impressed with Abbas' performance and invited him to a screen test for Kadhal Desam (1996), before eventually signing him on to play a leading role. Unfamiliar with the Tamil language, Abbas memorised his lines on the set of the film and Kadhir began the shoot with easier portions, in order to ease Abbas into his role. Featuring alongside Vineeth and Tabu, Kadhal Desam became a critical and commercial success and Abbas was dubbed by the media as a "heart-throb" and garnered several more acting offers. His busy schedule meant that he missed out on various successful films including Kadhalukku Mariyadhai (1997) and Jeans (1998), and the Tamil films he appeared in such as Jolly (1998) Ini Ellam Sugame (1998), Aasai Thambi (1998) were predominantly box office failures. Meanwhile, the success of Kaadhal Desam's dubbed Telugu version, allowed him to make a breakthrough in Telugu films and his next ventures Priya O Priya (1997) and Rajahamsa (1998) were profitable. He also appeared in the youth-centric Kannada film, Shanti Shanti Shanti (1999), featuring alongside debutant Madhavan for the first time.

Following a spell of commercially disappointing Tamil films as the lead actor, Abbas worked on several prestigious films in the early 2000s as a second hero. He appeared as Rajinikanth's son-in-law in Padayappa (1999), before portraying the role of a doctor in Kamal Haasan's historical film, Hey Ram (2000). Abbas then appeared in Rajiv Menon's multi-starrer Kandukondain Kandukondain (2000), in which he was paired with Aishwarya Rai, and the film went on to win positive reviews from critics. In 2001, he made further supporting appearances in the commercially successful films, Minnale by Gautham Vasudev Menon and Aanandham by N. Linguswamy, with Mammootty as well in Pammal K. Sambandam (2002) with Kamal Haasan again, and critics labelled the period as a "career high". He appeared in a music video for Rajshri Pictures and was subsequently given the opportunity from producers to appear in Hindi films, then made his debut with Ansh (2002). The failure of the film prompted two further films, including Aur Phir with Bipasha Basu to be shelved, and he continued to appear in Tamil films in supporting roles through the mid-2000s.

With multi-starrers diminishing in Tamil cinema, Abbas appeared in some low-budget ventures such as Unarchigal (2005) and 47A Besant Nagar Varai (2006), before opting to pursue anti-hero roles. He starred as a womaniser in the horror film Shock (2004) and Thiruttu Payale (2006), and then also played a comic villain in Sadhu Miranda (2008) and Guru En Aalu (2009). In 2010, he made a return to Kannada films with the family drama Appu and Pappu, portraying the father of young boy. In recent years, Abbas has appeared in television serials, while he also portrayed scientist Prasanta Chandra Mahalanobis in Ramanujan (2014).
As his acting career started to decline, He settled down in  Auckland, New Zealand with his family and is currently working as a Business Analyst. He also became a motivational speaker to teenagers who have suicidal thoughts.

Personal life
Abbas was born on 21 May 1975. He married Erum Hussain Khan, in 1997. Erum after marriage launched her own label known as Erum ALi & EA Bridal Lounge. The couple have two kids a daughter Emira & a son Aymaan. Erum  designed costumes for movies' notably Aayirathil Oruvan and Guru En Aalu where his co-star Madhavan's wife, Saritha, too worked as designer.He left his acting career in 2015 and works as a software engineer in his newly settled place, Auckland, New Zealand.

Music videos

Filmography

Television

References

External links

1975 births
Living people
Indian male film actors
Bengali male actors
Tamil male television actors
Tamil television presenters
Television personalities from Tamil Nadu
Male actors from Kolkata
Male actors in Tamil cinema
Male actors in Telugu cinema
Male actors in Kannada cinema
Male actors in Malayalam cinema
Male actors in Hindi cinema
20th-century Indian male actors
21st-century Indian male actors
Bengali male television actors